The Baum is a pub at 33-37 Toad Lane, Rochdale, Greater Manchester, England.

It was CAMRA's National Pub of the Year for 2013.

References

External links

Pubs in Greater Manchester
Buildings and structures in Rochdale